The Danish Woodworkers' Union (TAF) was a trade union representing workers in wood manufacturing and construction in Denmark.

The union was founded in 1895, as the Sawmill and Machine Workers' Federation of Denmark.  It later affiliated to the Danish Confederation of Trade Unions.

Several smaller union merged into TAF:
 1950: Basket Makers' Union
 1954: Turners' Union
 1954: Corkscrew and Sortererskernes' Union
 1970: Picture Framers' Union

By 1996, the union had 23,710 members.  At the start of 1997, it merged with the Danish Union of Joiners and Carpenters, to form the Danish Timber Industry and Construction Workers' Union.

References

Danish Confederation of Trade Unions
Building and construction trade unions
Trade unions in Denmark
Trade unions established in 1895
Trade unions disestablished in 1997